Ismael José Gonçalves Pinto (born 26 April 1993) is a Portuguese footballer who plays for U.S.C. Paredes, as a forward.

Football career
On 19 August 2012, Pinto made his professional debut with Penafiel in a 2012–13 Segunda Liga match against Marítimo B replacing Sérgio Organista (85th minute).

References

External links

Stats and profile at LPFP

1993 births
Living people
People from Penafiel
Portuguese footballers
Association football forwards
Liga Portugal 2 players
F.C. Penafiel players
Rebordosa A.C. players
C.D. Cinfães players
U.S.C. Paredes players
Sportspeople from Porto District